Cornelia Polit (later Embacher, born 18 February 1963) is a former swimmer from East Germany. At age seventeen she won the silver medal in the women's 200 m backstroke at the 1980 Summer Olympics, behind her team mate Rica Reinisch. She won a silver and a gold medal in the 100 m and 200 m backstroke at the 1981 European Aquatics Championships, respectively. Two years later she repeated this achievement, but in the butterfly events.

References

1963 births
Living people
People from Saalekreis
German female swimmers
Female backstroke swimmers
Swimmers at the 1980 Summer Olympics
Olympic swimmers of East Germany
Olympic silver medalists for East Germany
Female butterfly swimmers
European Aquatics Championships medalists in swimming
Medalists at the 1980 Summer Olympics
Olympic silver medalists in swimming
Sportspeople from Saxony-Anhalt